OIB may refer to:

Ocean island basalts, rocks
Office for Infrastructure and logistics – Brussels
Option Internationale du Baccalauréat of the French baccalauréat
Orient-Institut Beirut, a research institute in Lebanon
Personal identification number (Croatia)